Edward R. Murrow Park is a park located in Washington, D.C. at the corner of H Street NW and 18th Street NW. The National Park site is related to World War II, and is named after journalist Edward R. Murrow.

Events
In April 2009, a group of activists gathered at the park to protest the International Monetary Fund and World Bank. In 2011, the park served as a protest site as part of Occupy D.C.

References

External links
 

Parks in Washington, D.C.
Downtown (Washington, D.C.)